eGain Corporation (formerly known as eGain Communications Corporation) is a cloud-based software company with its headquarters at Sunnyvale, California. eGain provides applications for customer service, knowledge management, and analytics, that businesses use to serve and sell to their customers. The company is listed on NASDAQ.

History
eGain Corporation was founded as eGain Communications Corporation by Ashutosh Roy and Gunjan Sinha in late 1997. At the time, they both were part of WhoWhere?, an Internet search company they founded which was purchased by Lycos in 1998. Prior to the purchase by Lycos, Roy served as the company's CEO and chairman and Sinha served as its president.

eGain filed for its initial public offering with the Securities and Exchange Commission in July 1999. At the time of filing, it employed 114 people with plans to trade on the NASDAQ. The company's stock began trading on the NASDAQ in September of that same year, going from $12 to $23 per share within its first few days of trading. eGain filed for a secondary offering of common stock in February 2013.

eGain bought Inference Corporation, Novato, California in March, 2000.

The company changed its name from eGain Communications Corporation to eGain Corporation in November 2012. eGain acquired Exony Limited, a multichannel analytics and contact center management company, in August 2014.

Products and services
The eGain software suite comprises three groups of apps: Conversation Hub, Knowledge Hub, Analytics Hub. The Conversation Hub includes interaction channels for connecting with customers—live chat, cobrowse, email, secure email, social, and popular messaging apps. The Knowledge Hub consists of knowledge management software that is used on self-help websites by customers and by contact center agents and store and field personnel to help customers when they contact for help. The Knowledge Hub also includes the conversational virtual assistant or chatbot software. eGain's knowledge software includes Inference's patented AI case-based reasoning capability that eGain acquired when it bought Inference Corporation in 2000. The Analytics Hub has apps that provide reports on agent productivity, knowledge base use, interaction channel use, and customer journeys. Artificial Intelligence and Machine Learning technologies are used to automate, learn, and predict customer engagement.

eGain provides cloud-based customer engagement software to B2C companies in the financial services, telco, retail, government, health care, and utilities sectors mainly. Among its first products was eGain Mail, launched in 1998 to help companies manage large volumes of customer emails.

Partnerships 
eGain has partnerships with large contact center infrastructure vendors like Cisco, Avaya, Amazon Connect. W

References

1999 initial public offerings
Companies established in 1997
Companies based in Sunnyvale, California
Companies listed on the Nasdaq
Dot-com bubble
Software companies of the United States